The 2013 Bangladesh Premier League season, also known as BPL 2 or Prime Bank BPL 2013 (for sponsorship reasons), was the second season of the Bangladesh Premier League, established by the Bangladesh Cricket Board (BCB) in 2012. The tournament began on 18 January 2013 and ended on 19 February. The competition featured seven teams, with the addition of the Rangpur Riders. Dhaka Gladiators became champions again by beating Chittagong Kings by 43 runs in the final.

This season did not include any Pakistan players as the Pakistan Cricket Board refused to release the 27 players sold at the auction in retaliation to Bangladesh cancelling their international tour of Pakistan over safety issues.

Venues

Most of the matches were held at the Sher-e-Bangla Cricket Stadium in Dhaka. For the first time, matches were played in Khulna at the Sheikh Abu Naser Stadium. MA Aziz Stadium hosted the matches in Chittagong, instead of Zohur Ahmed Chowdhury Stadium, which hosted the tournament in the first season.

Player auction

The player auction was held on 20 December 2012. Changes were made this season to the players' salaries structure, including the introduction of restrictions on payment to players. This glorious Auction were host by the popular & sensational film Actress Alisha Pradhan along with other honourable BPL members. Players were divided into the following categories:

Teams and standings 

 Top 4 teams qualifies for the playoffs
  advanced to the Qualifier 1
  advanced to the Eliminator
Note: Rajshahi qualified for the fourth position, due to head-to-head record against Rangpur and Barisal.

League progression

Fixtures 
All times are in Bangladesh Standard Time (UTC+06:00).

Group stage

Phase 1

Phase 2

Phase 3

Phase 4

Playoff stage 

Qualifier 1

Elimination 

Qualifier 2

Final

Statistics

Highest team totals
The following table lists the five highest team scores during this season.

Most runs
The top five highest run scorers in the season are included in this table.

Most wickets
The top five highest wicket-takers in the season are included in this table.

See also
 2013 Bangladesh Premier League squads
 2012–13 Bangladeshi cricket season

References

External links 
 Tournament website on ESPN Cricinfo
 Bangladesh Premier League Score, News Site                  
 Official website of the Bangladesh Cricket Board

2013 Bangladesh Premier League
Bangladesh Premier League
Bangladesh Premier League seasons
2013 in cricket